This is a list of National Basketball Association players whose last names begin with E or F.

The list also includes players from the American National Basketball League (NBL), the Basketball Association of America (BAA), and the original American Basketball Association (ABA). All of these leagues contributed to the formation of the present-day NBA.

Individuals who played in the NBL prior to its 1949 merger with the BAA are listed in italics, as they are not traditionally listed in the NBA's official player registers.

E

Ledell Eackles
Jim Eakins
Acie Earl
Ed Earle
Cleanthony Early
Tari Eason
Mark Eaton
Jerry Eaves
Devin Ebanks
Floyd Ebaugh
Bill Ebben
Al Eberhard
Ndudi Ebi
Roy Ebron
Jaime Echenique
Jarell Eddie
Patrick Eddie
Dwight Eddleman
Kenton Edelin
Charles Edge
Bobby Joe Edmonds
Keith Edmonson
Tyus Edney
Anthony Edwards
Bill Edwards
Blue Edwards
Carsen Edwards
Corsley Edwards
Doug Edwards
Franklin Edwards
Gran Edwards
James Edwards
Jay Edwards
John Edwards
Kessler Edwards
Kevin Edwards
Leroy Edwards
Rob Edwards
Shane Edwards
Tommy Edwards
Vincent Edwards
Johnny Egan
Lonnie Eggleston
Bulbs Ehlers
Craig Ehlo
Rich Eichhorst
Howard Eisley
Obinna Ekezie
Khalid El-Amin
Don Eliason
Mario Elie
C. J. Elleby
Ray Ellefson
Henry Ellenson
Wayne Ellington
Denny Elliot
Bob Elliott
Sean Elliott
Bo Ellis
Boo Ellis
Dale Ellis
Harold Ellis
Joe Ellis
Keon Ellis
LaPhonso Ellis
LeRon Ellis
LeRoy Ellis
Monta Ellis
Pervis Ellison
Len Elmore
Don Elser
Francisco Elson
Darrell Elston
Melvin Ely
Joel Embiid
Wayne Embry
Andre Emmett
Ned Endress
Warner Engdahl
Wayne Engelstad
Chris Engler
A. J. English
Alex English
Claude English
Jo Jo English
Kim English
Scott English
Gene Englund
James Ennis III
Tyler Ennis
Charlie Epperson
Ray Epps
Ed Erban
Semih Erden
Bo Erias
Keith Erickson
Mark Ertel
Julius Erving
Evan Eschmeyer
Jack Eskridge
Vincenzo Esposito
Billy Evans
Bob Evans
Brian Evans
Dick Evans
Earl Evans
Hank Evans
Jacob Evans
Jawun Evans
Jeremy Evans
Maurice Evans
Mike Evans
Reggie Evans
Tyreke Evans
Byron Evard
Daniel Ewing
Patrick Ewing
Patrick Ewing Jr.
Ken Exel
Dante Exum
Christian Eyenga
Festus Ezeli
Johnny Ezersky

F

Joe Fabel
John Fairchild
Teddy Falda
Tacko Fall
Phil Farbman
Kenneth Faried
Dick Farley
Jordan Farmar
Desmon Farmer
Jim Farmer
Mike Farmer
Tony Farmer
Bill Farrow
Bob Faught
Vítor Faverani
Derrick Favors
Nick Fazekas
Fred Fechtman
Dave Fedor
Bob Feerick
Butch Feher
Jamie Feick
Ron Feiereisel
George Feigenbaum
Dave Feitl
Cristiano Felício
Kay Felder
Carrick Felix
Noel Felix
Ray Felix
Raymond Felton
Jake Fendley
Warren Fenley
Desmond Ferguson
Terrance Ferguson
Rudy Fernandez
Bruno Fernando
Eric Fernsten
Al Ferrari
Rolando Ferreira
Duane Ferrell
Yogi Ferrell
Arnie Ferrin
Bob Ferry
Danny Ferry
Kyrylo Fesenko
Bobby Fields
Kenny Fields
Landry Fields
Adam Filipczak
Ron Filipek
Greg Fillmore
Larry Finch
Hank Finkel
Michael Finley
Danny Finn
Dorian Finney-Smith
Matt Fish
Derek Fisher
Rick Fisher
Gerald Fitch
Malik Fitts
Wilson Fitts
Bob Fitzgerald
Dick Fitzgerald
Marcus Fizer
Jerry Fleishman
Al Fleming
Ed Fleming
Vern Fleming
Gordon Flick
Luis Flores
Bruce Flowers
Sleepy Floyd
Jonny Flynn
Malachi Flynn
Mike Flynn
Larry Fogle
Jack Foley
Isaac Fontaine
Levi Fontaine
Simone Fontecchio
Jeff Foote
Bryn Forbes
Gary Forbes
Aleem Ford
Alphonso Ford
Alton Ford
Bob Ford
Chris Ford
Don Ford
Jake Ford
Len Ford
Phil Ford
Sharrod Ford
Sherell Ford
T. J. Ford
Donnie Forman
Bayard Forrest
Trent Forrest
Joseph Forte
Ernie Fortney
Courtney Fortson
Danny Fortson
Fred Foster
Greg Foster
Jeff Foster
Jimmy Foster
Michael Foster
Rod Foster
Antonis Fotsis
Evan Fournier
Larry Foust
Steve Fowdy
Calvin Fowler
Jerry Fowler
Tremaine Fowlkes
De'Aaron Fox
Harold Fox
Jim Fox
Rick Fox
Wilbur Fox
Randy Foye
Adonal Foyle
Richie Frahm
Chet Francis
Steve Francis
Tellis Frank
Nat Frankel
Jamaal Franklin
Will Franklin
Robert Franks
Ron Franz
Nick Frascella
Melvin Frazier
Michael Frazier II
Tim Frazier
Walt Frazier
Wilbert Frazier
Anthony Frederick
Jimmer Fredette
World B. Free
Joel Freeland
Donnie Freeman
Gary Freeman
Rod Freeman
Matt Freije
Frido Frey
Larry Friend
Pat Frink
Ted Fritsch
Jim Fritsche
Channing Frye
Bernie Fryer
Frank Fucarino
Herm Fuetsch
Joe Fulks
Carl Fuller
Hiram Fuller
Homer Fuller
Todd Fuller
Tony Fuller
Markelle Fultz
Lawrence Funderburke
Dick Furey
Terry Furlow

References
  NBA & ABA Players with Last Names Starting with E and  F @ basketball-reference.com
 NBL Players with Last Names Starting with E and F @ basketball-reference.com

E